Park Jae-hong (Hangul: 박재홍, Hanja: 朴栽弘; born September 7, 1973, in Gwangju, South Korea) is a retired South Korean outfielder in the KBO League. Park was considered one of the best five-tool players in the KBO. He was the first player in KBO history to have 30 home runs and 30 stolen bases (in ) and the only player to have more than two seasons of 30 home runs and 30 stolen bases, doing so a record three times: (and ). He was a 30-30 player in his debut season (1996), the only person to do so until Mike Trout, who did it in 2012.

Park competed in the 2000 Summer Olympics, and led his team to the bronze medal in the baseball tournament.

Amateur career

While attending Gwangju Jeil High School, Park was a highly regarded right-handed power pitcher. In , he was selected for the South Korean national junior baseball team as a pitcher to compete against the Japan and USA national junior teams at the 3-nation friendly baseball series in California, United States. The Korean team swept all the games with a record of 4-0 and Park drew attention from MLB scouts along with fellow pitchers Park Chan-ho and Lim Sun-dong.

In , upon graduation from high school, Park started to play college baseball at Yonsei University, converting his position to third base. While at Yonsei University, Park led his team to five college championships in four years alongside Lim Sun-dong and Cho In-sung.

In , as a sophomore Park was selected for the South Korea national baseball team and competed in the Asian Baseball Championship held in Perth, Australia. The South Korean team won silver and Park was named to the All-Star Team as a third baseman.

After the 1995 college season, he signed with the Hyundai Phoenix in the Korea Baseball Association amateur league, refusing to join the KBO pro league in order to participate in the 1996 Summer Olympics the following year.

Notable international careers

Professional career

Hyundai Unicorns

After the  KBO season, the Pacific Dolphins based in Incheon was purchased by Hyundai Group due to financial difficulties, and the team was moved before the  season to Suwon and renamed the Hyundai Unicorns. Due to the business relationship between the Phoenix and the Unicorns, five players in the Hyundai Phoenix roster moved to the Hyundai Unicorns and Park eventually decided to join the pro league, signing with the Unicorns in March 1996. In the 1996 KBO season, as a rookie Park become the first player in KBO history to join the 30–30 club. He also won the home run and RBI titles and Golden Glove Awards as an outfielder. After the season, Park was named Rookie of the Year in unanimous vote and runner-up behind Koo Dae-sung of the Hanwha Eagles in the MVP balloting.

Park joined his second 30–30 club in  when he hit 30 home runs and stole a career-high 43 bases. After the season, Park was selected for the South Korea national baseball team and led his team to their first Asian Games gold medal in the baseball tournament, batting .455 with 3 home runs and 12 RBI.

Park joined his third 30–30 club in the  KBO season when he hit 32 home runs and stole 30 bases. Park also won his second RBI title, driving in 115 runs. In September 2000, he competed for South Korea in the 2000 Summer Olympics where they won the bronze medal in the baseball tournament.

Kia Tigers 
Prior to the  season, Park was traded to the Kia Tigers for third baseman Jeong Seong-hoon. In 2003, he had his third .300 plus batting average (.301) season, accumulating 19 home runs, 66 RBI and 14 stolen bases.

In , Park hit his 200th career home run on May 11 to become the tenth player in 22-year KBO history to reach the milestone. However, he had his worst pro season due to injuries, batting a career-low .253 and hitting only 7 home runs and 47 hits in 73 games played.

SK Wyverns

After the  season, Park was traded to the SK Wyverns where he played center field and batted cleanup or 5th in the order.

On July 23, Park joined the 200-200 club as its first member in KBO history, getting his 200th stolen base of his career.

In the  season, Park had 17 home runs, and led the Wyverns to their first Korean Series championship.

On April 23, Park stole his 250th base of his career, and this made him the first member of KBO's 250-250 club.

After the  season, Wyverns offered him the coaching job but he wanted to stay as a player. On November 25, 2011, Wyverns confirmed that he would play for the team one more year.

On October 3, Park became the seventh player ever to hit 300 home runs. He also became the oldest player to slug 300 home runs when he accomplished the feat at the age of 39 years and 26 days.

On January 23,  Park announced his retirement as a pro baseball player. After his retirement he acted as a baseball TV commentator.

Notable international careers

See also 
 List of KBO career home run leaders
 List of KBO career stolen bases leaders

References

External links 
 
Career statistics and player information from Korea Baseball Organization 
 databaseolympics

1973 births
Asian Games medalists in baseball
Baseball players at the 1994 Asian Games
Baseball players at the 1998 Asian Games
Baseball players at the 2000 Summer Olympics
Baseball players at the 2002 Asian Games
Baseball players at the 2006 Asian Games
Baseball announcers
Hyundai Unicorns players
Kia Tigers players
KBO League Rookie of the Year Award winners
KBO League right fielders
Living people
Medalists at the 2000 Summer Olympics
Olympic baseball players of South Korea
Olympic bronze medalists for South Korea
Olympic medalists in baseball
SSG Landers players
South Korean baseball players
Sportspeople from Gwangju
Asian Games gold medalists for South Korea
Asian Games silver medalists for South Korea
Asian Games bronze medalists for South Korea
Medalists at the 1994 Asian Games
Medalists at the 1998 Asian Games
Medalists at the 2002 Asian Games
Medalists at the 2006 Asian Games
Yonsei University alumni